Abderrahmane Anou (born 29 January 1991) is an Algerian middle-distance runner who competes primarily in the 1500 metres. He represented his country at the 2017 World Championships without advancing to the semifinals. He also won a silver medal at the 2010 World Junior Championships.

International competitions

1Did not finish in the final

Personal bests

Outdoors
800 metres – 1:47.81 (La Roche-sur-Yon 2013)
1000 metres – 2:17.92 (Nancy 2015)
1500 metres – 3:35.2 (Algiers 2011)
3000 metres – 7:52.54 (Sotteville 2015)
3000 metres steeplechase – 8:51.59 (Sotteville 2016)
10 kilometres – 28:47 (Barcelona 2016)

'Indoors
1500 metres – 3:40.88 (Reims 20117)
3000 metres – 7:58.50 (Metz 2017)

References

1991 births
Living people
Algerian male middle-distance runners
World Athletics Championships athletes for Algeria
Athletes (track and field) at the 2013 Mediterranean Games
Mediterranean Games competitors for Algeria
21st-century Algerian people
20th-century Algerian people